Otto Pfister (born 3 November 1900, date of death unknown) was a Swiss gymnast who competed in the 1924 Summer Olympics and in the 1928 Summer Olympics.

References

1900 births
Year of death missing
Swiss male artistic gymnasts
Olympic gymnasts of Switzerland
Gymnasts at the 1924 Summer Olympics
Gymnasts at the 1928 Summer Olympics
Olympic gold medalists for Switzerland
Olympic bronze medalists for Switzerland
Olympic medalists in gymnastics
Medalists at the 1928 Summer Olympics
Medalists at the 1924 Summer Olympics
20th-century Swiss people